Dr Moses Ebuk is a Ugandan neurophysiologist, academic and diplomat.

Ebuk, a neurophysiologist, was a lecturer in the College of Health Sciences at the Makerere University in Mulago.

In 2005, Ebuk was appointed as Ambassador of Uganda to the Democratic Republic of the Congo after President of Uganda Yoweri Museveni's first appointment, Jacob Okello, had his appointment rejected by the Democratic Republic of Congo government in Kinshasa.

On 11 September 2008, Ebuk was appointed by President of Uganda Yoweri Museveni as Ambassador of Uganda to Russia. He presented his diplomatic credentials to President of Russia Dmitry Medvedev on 27 February 2009.

References 

Ugandan diplomats
Year of birth missing (living people)
Living people
Ambassadors of Uganda to Russia
Ambassadors of Uganda to the Democratic Republic of the Congo
Neurophysiologists
Ugandan neurologists
Academic staff of Makerere University